Jones v. Harris Associates L.P., 559 U.S. 335 (2010), is a case decided by the United States Supreme Court in which investors claimed that the fees they paid to an investment advisor were too steep, violating the Investment Company Act of 1940.

The case held that the court has the jurisdiction to regulate fees of investment advisers in the mutual fund industry under the Investment Company Act of 1940, when those fees are excessive, and in breach of fiduciary duty. It is notable from a law and economics perspective for the vigorous opinion in the Seventh Circuit Court of Appeal of Judge Frank Easterbrook and the powerful dissent of Richard Posner, regarding the necessity and market failure in respect of adviser fee regulation.

Background 
Harris Associates LP was the adviser to a set of $47bn Chicago funds including the Oakmark brands and is owned by French fund Natixis. The mutual funds are ‘open ended’ meaning they buy back shares at current asset value. Harris Associates was sued by Jones and other investors in Harris’ mutual funds. They argued that under the Investment Company Act 1940 s 36(b) and Gartenberg v. Merrill Lynch Asset Management, Inc., 694 F.2d 923 (2d Cir. 1982) the company's fees were unreasonably high.

After an adverse finding in the Illinois District Court, Jones appealed to the Seventh Circuit Court of Appeals.

Seventh Circuit
The majority of the Court of Appeals ruled against the plaintiffs citing a lack of judicial authority to regulate investment company fees. Easterbrook, reading for the majority, argued that the free market was the best regulator of the fees. Easterbrook rejected the argument, saying the government was in no place to make such an assessment. ‘Like the plaintiffs, the second circuit in Gartenberg expressed some skepticism of competition’s power to constrain investment advisers’ fees.

Posner, reading a dissenting judgment, argued that the majority's decision ran counter to well established principle in Gartenberg, that the market was ineffective to solve the problem and that procedurally the decision was flawed since it was not circulated prior to publication, as is required in the case of a circuit split. He would have held that the case should be heard en banc (i.e. all the judges of the bench give a full hearing).

Jones then appealed to the Supreme Court which granted certiorari on March 9, 2009.

Opinion of the Court 
The Supreme Court unanimously agreed with the plaintiffs and held the Seventh Circuit erred in holding that claims alleging mutual fund management's fees were too high is not cognizable under Section 36(b) of the Investment Company Act. Justice Alito wrote the majority opinion arguing the Seventh Circuit Court of Appeals erred in not applying the established standard from Gartenberg v. Merrill Lynch Asset Management, Inc.. The Court established that the ICA requires for a claim to be valid there must be a determination that the fee is "so disproportionately large it bears no reasonable relationship to the services rendered."

Notes

External links
 Case Profile at ScotusWiki
 Taxi firm legal issues like Rideshare, Transport Licensing Division (PTLD) 

United States Supreme Court cases
2009 in United States case law
United States Supreme Court cases of the Roberts Court